The William McKinstry Jr. House is a historic house at 915 W. Main Street in Southbridge, Massachusetts. It is a 2+ story building, unusual because of its distinctive monitor roof.  Its construction date is unknown, but it is documented in a painting of Southbridge's Globe Village area in 1822.  It appears to have been intended for housing, but the monitor roof is more typically associated with mill buildings.  It is known to have been occupied by William McKinstry Jr., son of an early Southbridge settler, in 1836.

The house was listed on the National Register of Historic Places in 1989.

See also
National Register of Historic Places listings in Southbridge, Massachusetts
National Register of Historic Places listings in Worcester County, Massachusetts

References

External links
 William McKinstry Jr. House MACRIS Listing

Federal architecture in Massachusetts
Houses completed in 1815
Houses in Southbridge, Massachusetts
National Register of Historic Places in Southbridge, Massachusetts
Houses on the National Register of Historic Places in Worcester County, Massachusetts